Blondeliini is a tribe of parasitic flies in the family Tachinidae.  Larvae are parasitoids of other insects, mostly beetles and caterpillars.  Although nearly cosmopolitan, its greatest diversity is in the New World and especially in South America.

Genera
Actinodoria Townsend, 1927
Admontia Brauer & von Bergenstamm, 1889
Aesia Richter, 2011
Afrolixa Curran, 1939
Anagonia Brauer & von Bergenstamm, 1891
Anametopochaeta Townsend, 1919
Anechuromyia Mesnil & Shima, 1979
Angustia Sellers, 1943
Anisia Wulp, 1890
Anomalostomyia Cerretti & Barraclough, 2007
Anoxynops Townsend, 1927
Balde Rice, 2005
Bampura Tschorsnig, 1983
Belida Robineau-Desvoidy, 1863
Binghamimyia Townsend, 1919
Biomeigenia Mesnil, 1961
Blondelia Robineau-Desvoidy, 1830
Borgmeiermyia Townsend, 1935
Caenisomopsis Townsend, 1934
Calodexia Wulp, 1891
Calolydella Townsend, 1927
Celatoria Coquillett, 1890
Chaetodoria Townsend, 1927
Chaetolixophaga Blanchard, 1940
Chaetona Wulp, 1891
Chaetonodexodes Townsend, 1916
Chaetostigmoptera Townsend, 1916
Chaetoxynops Townsend, 1928
Compsilura Bouché, 1834
Compsiluroides Mesnil, 1953
Conactia Townsend, 1927
Conactiodoria Townsend, 1934
Conogaster Brauer & von Bergenstamm, 1891
Croesoactia Townsend, 1927
Cryptomeigenia Brauer & von Bergenstamm, 1891
Cuparymyia Townsend, 1934
Degeeriopsis Mesnil, 1953
Deltomyza Malloch, 1931
Dexodomintho Townsend, 1935
Dolichocoxys Townsend, 1927
Dolichotarsina Mesnil, 1977
Dolichotarsus Brooks, 1945
Drinomyia Mesnil, 1962
Egameigenia Townsend, 1927
Embiomyia Aldrich, 1934
Enrogalia Reinhard, 1964
Eomedina Mesnil, 1960
Eomeigenielloides Reinhard, 1975
Eophyllophila Townsend, 1926
Epiphanocera Townsend, 1915
Eribella Mesnil, 1960
Erynniola Mesnil, 1977
Erynniopsis Townsend, 1926
Erythroargyrops Townsend, 1917
Erythromelana Townsend, 1919
Euanisia Blanchard, 1947
Eucelatoria Townsend, 1909
Euhalidaya Walton, 1914
Eumachaeraea Townsend, 1927
Euthelyconychia Townsend, 1927
Filistea Cerretti & O’Hara, 2016
Froggattimyia Townsend, 1916
Gastrolepta Rondani, 1862
Hemimacquartia Brauer & von Bergenstamm, 1893
Hypodoria Townsend, 1927
Hypoproxynops Townsend, 1927
Ictericodexia Townsend, 1934
Incamyia Townsend, 1912
Incamyiopsis Townsend, 1919
Ischyrophaga Townsend, 1915
Istocheta Rondani, 1859
Italispidea Townsend, 1927
Italydella Townsend, 1927
Kallisomyia Borisova-Zinovjeva, 1964
Kiniatiliops Mesnil, 1955
Kiniatilla Villeneuve, 1938
Latiginella Villeneuve, 1936
Lecanipa Rondani, 1859
Leiophora Robineau-Desvoidy, 1863
Leptostylum Macquart, 1851
Leskiolydella Townsend, 1927
Ligeria Robineau-Desvoidy, 1863
Ligeriella Mesnil, 1961
Lindneriola Mesnil, 1959
Lixadmontia Wood & Cave, 2006
Lixophaga Townsend, 1908
Lomachantha Rondani, 1859
Lydellothelaira Townsend, 1919
Lydinolydella Townsend, 1927
Mauritiodoria Townsend, 1932
Medina Robineau-Desvoidy, 1830
Medinodexia Townsend, 1927
Medinomyia Mesnil, 1957
Medinospila Mesnil, 1977
Meigenia Robineau-Desvoidy, 1830
Meigenielloides Townsend, 1919
Melanorlopteryx Townsend, 1927
Melanoromintho Townsend, 1935
Mellachnus Aldrich, 1934
Metopoactia Townsend, 1927
Miamimyia Townsend, 1916
Miamimyiops Townsend, 1939
Microaporia Townsend, 1919
Minthopsis Townsend, 1915
Monoleptophaga Baranov, 1938
Myiodoriops Townsend, 1935
Myiomintho Brauer & von Bergenstamm, 1889
Myiopharus Brauer & von Bergenstamm, 1889
Neominthopsis Townsend, 1915
Neophasmophaga Guimarães, 1982
Notomanes Aldrich, 1934
Oedemamedina Townsend, 1927
Ollachactia Townsend, 1927
Ollachea Townsend, 1919
Ophirion Townsend, 1911
Opsomeigenia Townsend, 1919
Oswaldia Robineau-Desvoidy, 1863
Oxyaporia Townsend, 1919
Oxynops Townsend, 1912
Paracraspedothrix Villeneuve, 1920
Parapoliops Blanchard, 1957
Pararondania Villeneuve, 1916
Paratrixa Brauer & von Bergenstamm, 1891
Pareupogona Townsend, 1916
Paropsivora Malloch, 1934
Paxiximyia Toma & Olivier, 2018
Pelashyria Villeneuve, 1935
Phasmophaga Townsend, 1909
Phyllophilopsis Townsend, 1915
Phyllophryno Townsend, 1927
Phytorophaga Bezzi, 1923
Picconia Robineau-Desvoidy, 1863
Pilimyia Malloch, 1930
Piximactia Townsend, 1927
Policheta Rondani, 1856
Poliops Aldrich, 1934
Prodegeeria Brauer & von Bergenstamm, 1894
Proroglutea Townsend, 1919
Prospherysodoria Townsend, 1928
Prosuccingulum Mesnil, 1959
Protaporia Townsend, 1919
Pseudoredtenbacheria Brauer & von Bergenstamm, 1889
Pseudorrhinactia Thompson, 1968
Pseudoviviania Brauer & von Bergenstamm, 1891
Ptilodegeeria Brauer & von Bergenstamm, 1891
Rhombothyriops Townsend, 1915
Rioteria Herting, 1973
Robinaldia Herting, 1983
Sphaerina Wulp, 1890
Staurochaeta Brauer & von Bergenstamm, 1889
Steleoneura Stein, 1924
Succingulodes Townsend, 1935
Tetrigimyia Shima & Takahashi, 2011
Tettigoniophaga Guimarães, 1978
Thelairochaetona Townsend, 1919
Thelairodoria Townsend, 1927
Thelairodoriopsis Thompson, 1968
Thelyoxynops Townsend, 1927
Trichinochaeta Townsend, 1917
Trigonospila Pokorny, 1886
Urodexia Osten Sacken, 1882
Uroeuantha Townsend, 1927
Uromedina Townsend, 1926
Vibrissina Rondani, 1861
Zaira Robineau-Desvoidy, 1830
Zenargomyia Crosskey, 1964
Zosteromeigenia Townsend, 1919

References

Brachycera tribes
Exoristinae